Thersites was a common Greek soldier in the Iliad who was physically beaten in assembly for insubordination. Thersites may also be:

 Thersites (gastropod), a genus of snails
 Megasoma thersites, a species of scarab beetle
 1868 Thersites, an asteroid
 Crambus thersites, a species of moth
 Thersites at the bar, a nickname of Luther Martin for his rebelliousness in assembly